Justin James is a composer, singer, and guitarist in Malayalam films. He is one of the founders of the Malayalam music composers group, 4 Musics.

Career
He appeared in a popular Malayalam TV show, comedy nites in 2018.

References

External links 

 

 

 

1982 births
Living people
Indian male playback singers
Singers from Kochi
Indian guitarists
Indian composers